Asplenium ascensionis is a species of fern in the family Aspleniaceae. It is endemic to Ascension Island.  Its natural habitats are receding due to introduced vegetation. It is threatened by habitat loss.

References

ascensionis
Near threatened plants
Flora of Ascension Island
Plants described in 1891
Taxonomy articles created by Polbot